Albin Ekdal (born 28 July 1989) is a Swedish professional footballer who plays as a midfielder for Serie A club Spezia and the Sweden national team.

Formed at IF Brommapojkarna, he has spent most of his career in Italy, where he has made over 200 Serie A appearances. He has represented Cagliari, Juventus, Siena, Bologna, and Sampdoria in the competition. He also spent three years in Germany's Bundesliga with Hamburger SV. Ekdal made his senior international debut for Sweden in 2011, and has since then earned over 60 caps for the nation. He has represented his country at UEFA Euro 2016, the 2018 FIFA World Cup, and UEFA Euro 2020.

Club career

Brommapojkarna
Albin Ekdal started his professional playing career with Brommapojkarna at the beginning of the 2007 Allsvenskan season. He played mainly as a central midfielder but also as an attacking midfielder or right midfielder.

Juventus
On 23 May 2008, Ekdal signed a four-year contract with Juventus of Italy's Serie A. He made his Serie A and club debut on 18 October in a 2–1 away defeat to Napoli, coming on as a substitute in the 75th minute for Christian Poulsen.

Loan to Siena 
On 15 July 2009, fellow Italian top-flight club Siena signed Ekdal on loan for a season. He made 27 appearances for the Tuscans, who were ultimately relegated at the end of the season, and scored once, in a 4–3 loss away to eventual treble winners Inter Milan on 9 January 2010.

Bologna 
On 28 June 2010, Juventus sold 50% of their ownership rights of Ekdal to Bologna. As per the deal, the two clubs would agree at the start of each season who would have him as a player. He played 23 total games for the Rossoblu and scored on the anniversary of his last goal, to open a 2–0 win at Bari.

Cagliari

On 23 August 2011, Ekdal was sold to fellow Serie A team Cagliari on a three-year deal for €3 million.

On 28 September 2014, Ekdal scored a hat-trick as Cagliari won 4–1 at Inter Milan.

Hamburger SV
On 18 July 2015, German club Hamburger SV signed Ekdal from Cagliari on a four-year deal for €4.5 million with wages of €600,000 per season. He was given the number 20 shirt.

He played 57 games for the side in total, who struggled against relegation in each of his three years with the team, ending with their ultimate descent into the 2. Bundesliga in 2018. He scored once for the team from Hamburg, the only goal of a home win against Hertha BSC on 5 March 2017.

On 21 January 2017, Ekdal received the first red card of his career, after 33 minutes of a 1–0 loss at VfL Wolfsburg.

Sampdoria
On 14 August 2018, following Hamburg's relegation from the Bundesliga, Ekdal returned to Serie A by signing for Sampdoria.

Spezia
On 13 July 2022, Ekdal signed a two-year contract with Spezia.

International career

Ekdal made his debut for Sweden on 10 August 2011 in a friendly game away to Ukraine in Kharkiv. He came on as a 60th-minute substitute for Sebastian Larsson in a 1–0 win.

Ekdal was named in Sweden's 23-man squad for UEFA Euro 2016 in France, despite a deep cut in his back from celebrating Hamburg's recent Bundesliga survival putting his involvement at risk. He played each match as the Swedes came bottom of their group.

In June 2018 Ekdal was named in Sweden's 23-man squad for the 2018 FIFA World Cup in Russia. He played all five games of a run to the quarter-finals.

Ekdal was included in Sweden's 26-man squad for UEFA Euro 2020.

Personal life
Ekdal grew up in Höglandet, an affluent suburb west of Stockholm. He is the son of Lennart Ekdal, an award-winning Swedish journalist, TV personality and newscaster known for his work for the newspaper Dagens Nyheter and the financial magazine Veckans Affärer, as well as hosting TV shows such as Kalla fakta, Halvtid för Reinfeldt (with Fredrik Reinfeldt), Kvällsöppet med Ekdal & Hakelius and Hetluft.

Ekdal's younger brother, Hjalmar Ekdal, is also a professional footballer who plays for Burnley FC.

Career statistics

Club

International

Appearances and goals by national team and year

Honours 
Individual

 Swedish Midfielder of the Year: 2013, 2014, 2015
 Stor Grabb: 2016

References

External links

 
 
  (archive)
 
 Goal.com profile

1989 births
Living people
Association football midfielders
Swedish footballers
Swedish expatriate footballers
Sweden international footballers
Sweden youth international footballers
Sweden under-21 international footballers
IF Brommapojkarna players
Allsvenskan players
Juventus F.C. players
A.C.N. Siena 1904 players
Bologna F.C. 1909 players
Cagliari Calcio players
Hamburger SV players
U.C. Sampdoria players
Spezia Calcio players
Serie A players
Bundesliga players
UEFA Euro 2016 players
2018 FIFA World Cup players
UEFA Euro 2020 players
Expatriate footballers in Italy
Expatriate footballers in Germany
Swedish expatriate sportspeople in Italy
Footballers from Stockholm
Swedish expatriate sportspeople in Germany